The conventional wisdom or received opinion is the body of ideas or explanations generally accepted by the public and/or by experts in a field.  In religion, this is known as orthodoxy.

Etymology
The term is often credited to the economist John Kenneth Galbraith, who used it in his 1958 book The Affluent Society:

However, the term dates back to at least 1838.  Conventional wisdom was used in a number of other works before Galbraith, occasionally in a benign
or neutral
sense, but more often pejoratively.
However, previous authors used it as a synonym for 'commonplace knowledge'. Galbraith specifically prepended 'The' to the phrase to emphasize its uniqueness, and sharpened its meaning to narrow it to those commonplace beliefs that are also acceptable and comfortable to society, thus enhancing their ability to resist facts that might diminish them. He repeatedly referred to it throughout the text of The Affluent Society, invoking it to explain the high degree of resistance in academic economics to new ideas. For these reasons, he is usually credited with the invention and popularization of the phrase in modern usage.

Accuracy

Conventional wisdom is not necessarily true. It is often seen as a hindrance to the acceptance of new information, and to the introduction of new theories and explanations, an obstacle that must be overcome by legitimate revisionism. That is, conventional wisdom has a property analogous to inertia that opposes the introduction of contrary belief, sometimes to the point of absurd denial of the new information or interpretation by persons strongly holding an outdated but conventional view. Since conventional wisdom is convenient, appealing, and deeply assumed by the public, this inertia can last even after many experts and/or opinion leaders have shifted to a new convention.

Conventional wisdom may be political, being closely related to the phenomenon of talking points. The term is used pejoratively to suggest that consistently repeated statements become conventional wisdom whether they are true or not.

More generally, it refers to accepted truth that almost no one seems to dispute, and so it is used as a gauge (or wellspring) of normative behavior or belief, even within a professional context. For example, the conventional wisdom in 1950, even among most doctors, was that smoking tobacco is not particularly harmful to one's health. The conventional wisdom today is that it is.  More narrowly, the conventional wisdom in science and engineering once was that a man would suffer lethal injuries if he experienced more than eighteen g-forces in an aerospace vehicle, but it is so no longer. (John Stapp repeatedly withstood far more in his research, peaking above 46 Gs in 1954).

Sometimes, the present conventional wisdom treats of past conventional wisdom. For example, "It is widely believed that prior to Christopher Columbus people thought the world was flat, but in actuality, scholars of that time had long accepted that the earth is a sphere." That sentence is true; yet, if enough people read and believed it, it would supplant the old belief (in a prevailing view of a flat earth in Columbus's time), becoming the new conventional wisdom. (Ironically, that shift would falsify the quoted sentence by declaring incorrectly that most people hold a false belief about the past.)

Integration with scientific evidence
Evidence-based medicine is a deliberate effort to acknowledge expert opinion (conventional wisdom) and how it coexists with scientific data.  Evidence-based medicine acknowledges that expert opinion is "evidence" and plays a role to fill the "gap between the kind of knowledge generated by clinical research studies and the kind of knowledge necessary to make the best decision for individual patients."

See also

 Anti-proverb
 Argumentum ad populum
 Boiling frog
 Common sense
 Consensus reality
 Convenience
 Contrarian
 Dominant ideology
 Mass psychology
 Paradigm shift
 Social constructionism
 Social loafing
 Speaking truth to power
 Truthiness

References

Informational notes

Citations

Further reading

Consensus reality
Public opinion